Hayden Moore (born July 5, 1995) is an American former professional Canadian football quarterback. He played college football for the Cincinnati Bearcats. He also played for the Hamilton Tiger-Cats of the Canadian Football League (CFL) in 2019.

College career

Statistics
In his first season as quarterback for the Bearcats, Moore threw for 1,885 yards, helping the Bearcats secure third place in their conference. 2016 saw Moore play as starting QB for the first time, where he threw for 1,744, an effort that was only enough for Cinicnnati to reach 4th in the division. 2017 was a breakout year for Moore; however, he was unable to convert his exemplary stats into wins for the Bearcats, with Cininnati finishing the season with only 4 wins.

Professional career
On May 2, 2019, Moore signed with the Hamilton Tiger-Cats as their third-string quarterback. He played during Week 2 of the CFL Preseason, playing the second half against the Ottawa Redblacks. Moore threw 176 yards and 2 touchdowns to win the game for Hamilton. Moore also played the last 8 minutes of Hamilton's Week 3 Preseason game against the Toronto Argonauts, throwing for 30 yards with 57% efficiency; however, Moore's efforts were not enough to overcome the Argos' defence, and the Ticats lost the game 30-23. He re-signed with the Tiger-Cats on January 7, 2021. He retired from football on June 28, 2021.

References

Canadian football quarterbacks
Players of American football from Alabama
Hamilton Tiger-Cats players
American football quarterbacks
Cincinnati Bearcats football players
1995 births
Living people